The 1906 Nebraska Cornhuskers football team represented the University of Nebraska in the 1906 college football season. The team was coached by first-year head coach Amos Foster and played its home games at Antelope Field in Lincoln, Nebraska. The team competed as an independent.

Prior to replacing the retiring Walter C. Booth at NU, Foster compiled an 11–4 record in two years coaching Cincinnati. Foster left Nebraska following the season and was quickly offered his old job at Cincinnati, but declined, instead accepting an offer to coach at Miami University in Oxford, Ohio.

Following the 1905 season, United States President Theodore Roosevelt urged Among the new rules adopted in 1906 included the legalization of the forward pass, an increase in the distance required to get a first down, the abolishment of the dangerous flying wedge, and the establishment of a neutral zone between the offense and defense at the line of scrimmage.

Schedule

Coaching staff

Roster

Game summaries

Hastings

South Dakota

Drake

Iowa State

Nebraska's 35-game home field winning streak, dating back to the beginning of the 1901 season, was broken when Iowa State beat NU 14–2. Only a late safety prevented Nebraska from being shut out.

Doane

at Minnesota

Minnesota shut out the Cornhuskers in Minneapolis for the second consecutive year in a game that remained scoreless until after halftime. Minnesota finished the season as co-champion of the Big Nine.

at Creighton

Nebraska shut out Creighton in Omaha in the final game between the two teams. NU defeated all other in-state teams for the third year in a row to claim another state championship.

Kansas

KU defeated a sloppy Nebraska team in the first game in a streak of 107 consecutive seasons the two teams played, still an NCAA record.

at Chicago

Nebraska was shut out by Chicago, then a member of the Big Nine Conference, in the first meeting between the two teams.

Cincinnati

Foster's former team traveled to Lincoln in what is still the only game ever played between Cincinnati and Nebraska. The teams were scheduled to play in 2020, but the game was canceled due to the COVID-19 pandemic. Cincinnati and Nebraska are scheduled to meet for the second time in 2025.

References

Nebraska
Nebraska Cornhuskers football seasons
Nebraska Cornhuskers football